Lawrence Dominick Wollersheim is an American former Scientologist. He has been an active director of several specialized non-profit organizations since 2002.

Wollersheim sued the Church of Scientology in 1980. The story of Xenu was made public when Church materials detailing the Operating Thetan Level 3 were used as exhibits. In Wollersheim's court case, Scientology's "top secret" materials about Xenu and their beliefs in past alien invasions of Earth was filed with the Los Angeles court on his behalf and then copied from court records and published by media all over the world.

Wollersheim helped co-found Factnet.org in 1993, an organization whose stated goal is to help other victims of cult abuse. He is currently a director of FactNet.

Legal actions

In 1986, a jury awarded Wollersheim 5 million USD in compensatory damages and 25 million USD in punitive damages for what jurors called intentional and negligent "infliction of emotional distress." On appeal this was reduced to 2.5 million USD. Scientology officials vowed never to pay, and the phrase "not one thin dime for Wollersheim," was chanted by Scientologists at court hearings. The church challenged the 2.5 million USD award, but the case was dismissed and Wollersheim was awarded an additional 130,506.71 USD in attorney's fees.

In 1997, Wollersheim's Boulder apartment was raided by federal marshals with Church of Scientology officials and his computers were seized as evidence.

After over 20 years, the Church agreed to settle the case and pay an 8.7 million USD settlement on May 9, 2002.

On October 28, 2005, the Metropolitan News-Enterprise, a Los Angeles daily legal publication, reported that the Wollersheim case was ongoing and a trial was forthcoming regarding the claim. It said that his attorney had received 100,000 USD, but she was suing for more. On December 8, 2006, Wollersheim won the case on appeal, as the plaintiff lacked an enforceable lien under the Rules of Professional Conduct.

FACTNet

In 1993, he co-founded Fight Against Coercive Tactics Network (FACTNet or F.A.C.T.Net) with Bob Penny.

References

American former Scientologists
Critics of Scientology
Scientology and law
Year of birth missing (living people)
Living people
Scientology and the Internet
American whistleblowers